is a run and gun video game developed by Sega and released in arcades in 1987.

Gameplay

Two players control two soldiers, named Ricky and Mary, who fight their way through large eight-way scrolling levels while rescuing their comrades who are being held by aliens. After they have rescued a certain number of hostages, the exit opens and they can pass through it in order to fight the end-of-level guardian. If this monstrosity is defeated, they are then able to move onto the next stage.
Alien Syndrome features two player simultaneous gameplay and pickups which assist the player, including better weapons and maps of the current level.

Ports
In 1988, the game was ported to the Master System, MSX, Amiga, Atari ST, Amstrad CPC, Commodore 64, and Famicom/Nintendo Entertainment System (published by Tengen without a Nintendo license). Later, the game was ported to the ZX Spectrum (1989), Game Gear (1992), and X68000 (1992).

Reception
In Japan, Game Machine listed Alien Syndrome on their May 15, 1987 issue as being the third most-successful table arcade unit of the month. The original arcade version of the game was reviewed in the July 1987 issue of Computer and Video Games, where Clare Edgeley described it as "one of the most gripping games" she "played in months", praising the Aliens-like horror atmosphere, chilling sounds, special effects, graphics and gameplay. She stated it was "the first time the atmosphere and sheer addictiveness of a shoot 'em up has transported me to another planet" and concluded that it "is fantastic".

The Master System version of the game was reviewed in Console XS magazine, giving it an 85% score. It was reviewed in 1989 in Dragon, getting two out of five stars.

Reviews
Computer and Video Games (Apr, 1988)
Power Play (Feb, 1988)
The Games Machine (Mar, 1988)
Sega Power (Dec, 1993)
ACE (Advanced Computer Entertainment) (May, 1988)

Legacy
The game was also converted to polygonal graphics for the PS2 as part of the Sega Ages re-release program and included in the US version of the Sega Classics Collection (it was removed from the European version to receive a lower age certificate). This version has updated controls, adding the use of both analog sticks, similar to that seen in Sheriff, Robotron: 2084 and Smash TV. The original arcade game was also included as an unlockable in Sonic's Ultimate Genesis Collection.

A sequel of the same name, Alien Syndrome, was released for Wii and PSP on July 24, 2007.

References

External links
Alien Syndrome at Arcade-History

1987 video games
Amiga games
Amstrad CPC games
Arcade video games
Atari ST games
Commodore 64 games
Cooperative video games
DOS games
Game Gear games
MSX games
Nintendo Entertainment System games
Run and gun games
Master System games
Sega arcade games
Sega Games franchises
Sega video games
X68000 games
Tengen (company) games
Unauthorized video games
Video games scored by David Whittaker
Video games featuring female protagonists
Video games about extraterrestrial life
ZX Spectrum games
Video games developed in Japan